Wood rose is a common name for several plants and may refer to:

 Dactylanthus taylorii, a parasitic plant endemic to New Zealand
 Hawaiian baby woodrose (Argyreia nervosa)
 Rosa gymnocarpa, a species of rose native to North America
 Species in the genus of Merremia